The Fenian Track is a historic walking track in Kahurangi National Park, in the West Coast Region of New Zealand. The track was originally constructed as a bridle track, to provide improved access to a gold mining site in Fenian Creek. Construction commenced from Market Cross, Karamea in 1876, but was not completed all the way to Fenian Creek until 1904. The route of the track follows the true left of the Ōpārara River, cut into slopes above the river. The track provides access to the Fenian Caves Loop – a route to three limestone caves that are a popular visitor attraction.

The three caves are named:

 Miner's Cave
 Tunnel Cave
 Cavern Creek Cave

The Fenian Caves Track is a loop from the main Fenian Track, and has an  underground section through Tunnel Cave.

The Fenian Track is graded as a 'walking track', but the Fenian Caves Loop Track is more rugged and is graded as a 'tramping track'.

References

Kahurangi National Park
Buller District
Hiking and tramping tracks in the West Coast, New Zealand